Alligator Reef Light is located  east of Indian Key, near the Matecumbe Keys of Florida in the United States, north of Alligator Reef itself. The station was established in 1873. It was automated in 1963 and was last operational in July, 2014, and is being replaced by a 16' steel structure with a less powerful light located adjacent to it. The structure is an iron pile skeleton with a platform. It is a white octagonal pyramid skeleton framework on black pile foundation, enclosing a square dwelling and a stair-cylinder. The lantern is black. The original lens was a first order bivalve Fresnel lens. The light characteristic of the original light was: flashing white and red, every third flash red, from SW by W 1/2 W through southward to NE 1/8 E, and from NE by E 3/4 E through northward to SW 3/8 S; flashing red throughout the intervening sectors; interval between flashes 5 seconds.

It is listed as number 980 in the USCG light lists.

Historical information
The name honors the U.S. Navy schooner Alligator, part of the U. S. Navy Anti-Piracy Squadron that had recently been established in Key West, which went aground at this location in 1822. The Alligator was blown up after removing as much as possible from it to prevent it from being used by pirates. Countless vessels have also sunk here on the reef's jagged coral. This lighthouse cost $185,000 to build at that time. To support the tower, a 2,000 lb (900 kg) hammer was used to drive the  iron pilings  into the coral.

Current situation
On February 1, 2019, it was announced that the lighthouse would be given away freely to any government agencies, educational agencies, non-profit corporations, or any community development organizations who wanted to use it for "educational, park, recreational, cultural or historic preservation purposes." This is in accordance with the National Historic Lighthouse Preservation Act.

See also

 List of lighthouses in Florida
 List of lighthouses in the United States

References

Bibliography

External links

 Florida Keys Reef Lights Foundation - FKRLF

Lighthouses completed in 1873
Lighthouses in Monroe County, Florida
Lighthouses on the National Register of Historic Places in Florida
National Register of Historic Places in Monroe County, Florida
1873 establishments in Florida